Marian Alexandru (born 20 September 1977) is a Romanian former football player.

References

External links
 

1977 births
Living people
Footballers from Bucharest
Romanian footballers
Association football defenders
Liga I players
Liga II players
FC Steaua București players
FCM Târgoviște players
FC Olimpia Satu Mare players
ACF Gloria Bistrița players
ASC Oțelul Galați players
FC Petrolul Ploiești players
FC Vaslui players
CSM Ceahlăul Piatra Neamț players
CS Concordia Chiajna players
Russian Premier League players
FC Spartak Vladikavkaz players
Romanian expatriate footballers
Romanian expatriate sportspeople in Russia
Expatriate footballers in Russia